An annular solar eclipse occurred at the Moon's descending node of the orbit on October 3, 2005, with a magnitude of 0.958. A solar eclipse occurs when the Moon passes between Earth and the Sun, thereby totally or partly obscuring the image of the Sun for a viewer on Earth. An annular solar eclipse occurs when the Moon's apparent diameter is smaller than the Sun's, blocking most of the Sun's light and causing the Sun to look like an annulus (ring). An annular eclipse appears as a partial eclipse over a region of the Earth thousands of kilometres wide. Occurring only 4.8 days after apogee (September 28, 2005), the Moon's apparent diameter was smaller.
It was visible from a narrow corridor through the Iberian peninsula and Africa and Brazil. A partial eclipse was seen from the much broader path of the Moon's penumbra, including all of Europe, Africa and southwestern Asia. The Sun was 96% covered in a moderate annular eclipse, lasting 4 minutes and 32 seconds and covering a broad path up to 162 km wide. The next solar eclipse in Africa occurred just 6 months later.

It was the 43rd eclipse of the 134th Saros cycle, which began with a partial eclipse on June 22, 1248, and will conclude with a partial eclipse on August 6, 2510.

Visibility
The path of the eclipse began in the North Atlantic ocean at 08:41 universal time (UT). The antumbra reached Madrid, Spain at 08:56 UT, lasting four minutes and eleven seconds and 90% of the Sun was covered by the Moon. The antumbra reached Algiers at 09:05 UT, then passed through Tunisia and Libya before heading southeast through Sudan, Kenya and Somalia. The shadow then moved out over the Indian Ocean until it terminated at sunset, 12:22 UT.

The maximum eclipse duration occurred in central Sudan at 10:31:42 UT, where it lasted for 4m 31s when the Sun was 71° above the horizon.

The motion of the shadow was supersonic and it generated gravity waves that were detectable as disturbances in the ionosphere. These gravity waves originate in the thermosphere at an altitude of about 180 km. Because of the obscuration of solar radiation, the ionization level dropped by 70% during the eclipse. The eclipse caused a 1–1.4 K drop in the temperature of the ionosphere.

Images

Related eclipses

Eclipse season 

This is the first eclipse this season.

Second eclipse this season: 17 October 2005 Partial Lunar Eclipse

Eclipses of 2005
 A hybrid solar eclipse on April 8.
 A penumbral lunar eclipse on April 24.
 An annular solar eclipse on October 3.
 A partial lunar eclipse on October 17.

Tzolkinex 
 Preceded: Solar eclipse of August 22, 1998

 Followed: Solar eclipse of November 13, 2012

Half-Saros 
 Preceded: Lunar eclipse of September 27, 1996

 Followed: Lunar eclipse of October 8, 2014

Tritos 
 Preceded: Solar eclipse of November 3, 1994

 Followed: Solar eclipse of September 1, 2016

Solar Saros 134 
 Preceded: Solar eclipse of September 23, 1987

 Followed: Solar eclipse of October 14, 2023

Inex 
 Preceded: Solar eclipse of October 23, 1976

 Followed: Solar eclipse of September 12, 2034

Solar eclipses 2004–2007

Saros 134

Metonic cycle

Notes

References 

Photos:
 Photos of solar eclipse around the world
 Spaceweather.com solar eclipse gallery
 Annular Solar Eclipse at High Resolution APOD 10/5/2005, annularity from Spain
 Annular Eclipse Madrid APOD 10/7/2005, annularity from Buen Retiro Park, Madrid, Spain
 Annular Eclipse Shirt APOD 10/14/2005, from Madrid, Spain

2005 10 3
2005 in science
2005 10 03
October 2005 events